Blindleia is an  long inland waterway in the municipality of Lillesand in Agder county, Norway. The strait starts in the Gamle Hellesund or Ulvøysund areas in southern Høvåg in the southwest (near Kristiansand) and it continues northeast past the town of Lillesand. It is a salt water fjord passage that is protected from the open sea by an elongated archipelago of skerries and larger islands.

Navigation through the passage is detailed but supposedly not difficult—since there are no tides and very little current—with clearly marked buoys and a few lighthouses along the way.

See also 
Åkerøya
Gamle Hellesund
Justøy
Skottevik
Kvåsefjorden

References

Lillesand
Geography of Agder